Karl Etti (26 October 1912 – 15 April 1996) was an Austrian composer. His work was part of the music event in the art competition at the 1936 Summer Olympics.

References

1912 births
1996 deaths
Austrian male composers
Olympic competitors in art competitions
Musicians from Vienna
20th-century male musicians